The 2001–02 Ismaily SC season was the club's 91st season in existence and the 31st consecutive season in the top flight of Egyptian football. In addition to the domestic league, Ismaily participated in this season's editions of the Egypt Cup and the African Cup Winners' Cup. The season covered the period from 1 July 2001 to 30 June 2002.

The team had a remarkable season, playing 34 games and suffering just one defeat.

Pre-season and friendlies

Competitions

Overview

Egyptian Premier League

League table

Results summary

Results by round

Matches

Egypt Cup

First round

Round of 16

Quarter-finals 

Source:

African Cup Winners' Cup

Quarter-finals

References

Ismaily SC seasons
Ismaily